Party of Croatian Right ( or SHP) is a conservative right-wing political party in Bosnia and Herzegovina.

Complaining about disunity and "abandonment of the original rights idea by many other existing rights parties", members of Party of Croatian Right, "who want to be loyal to the original rights teachings and goal", founded on 19 December 2004 a new political party in Livno. Ante Matić became the first president of the party.

Party states that they are national Croatian party that serves the interests of Croatian people and their actual spiritual and economic prosperity. Their goal is also to promote teachings of Ante Starčević and Eugen Kvaternik, founders of the original Party of Rights, social teachings of brothers Antun and Stjepan Radić, and also teaching of other historical national leaders of Croatian people whose actions were founded on teachings of Ante Starčević and also accepting of the newest technological achievements that will truly serve to whole humanity and especially to Croats on all of their historical territory.

Sources

Conservative parties in Bosnia and Herzegovina
Croat political parties in Bosnia and Herzegovina
Croatian nationalism in Bosnia and Herzegovina
Croatian nationalist parties
Croatian irredentism